Reflex is a BBC television game show hosted by Shane Richie and aired from 11 January to 29 March 2014 on BBC One.

Overview
Each episode consists of two families of three competing over a number of challenges in order to win their place in the final round to be in with a chance to win up to £20,000. Although most of the games are completed within mere seconds from the starting trigger, viewers watch them almost exclusively in slow motion. The real-time attempts are shown mostly as replays after the heat has finished, which is the reverse of the typical game show practices. All games require from contestants excellent hand-eye coordination, composure and, above all, the titular reflex. The show makes extensive use of both 2D and 3D computer-generated imagery, using for example 3D motion tracking to attach statistics graphics to contestants, or 3D wireframe animations to present the rules of a game.

The teams are color-coded: one wears purple and the other wears orange.

Gameplay

Round 1 – Duels
There are three head-to-head challenges in the first round; to each of them the families designate one player from their team to compete. Each person must take part in exactly one game.

Upon hearing the starting trigger, the players start performing the challenge and the first one to complete it wins one point for his/her team.

Some of the games featured included: smashing themselves through a pane of stunt glass and then crawling towards a big button, recreating a sequence in which some everyday objects were exploded, or retrieving one yellow can from a pyramid of grey cans and transferring it onto a finishing point.

Round 2 – Two vs two
In this round there is only one game in which two players from each team compete. The winning team gets two points.

Some of the games featured included: catching ten distinctively coloured balls from an avalanche of balls, or filling up a container with water which is being randomly shot from jets hidden all around the floor.

Round 3 – Quiz
In this round for the first time the entire teams face each other.

Each player has two buttons in front of them - an inactive one on which they place their hand and an active one located further from them. Then they are given a condition (e.g. when the domino adds up to eight) and are then presented with a series of photos or graphics. Once the image shown fulfills the condition, the first player to hit their active button, wins a point for their team. However, when a player presses the button when an incorrect graphics is shown, their opponents get the point. Then the condition still remains in play and the sequence continues until someone gets it right.

The first team to get to 10 points wins, proceeds to the Moneyball round, and the other team is eliminated from the show and leaves empty-handed. The points accumulated by the winning team throughout the show are reset to zero.

Round 4 – Moneyball
One player from the winning family is chosen to play the round. That team member then stands on an elevated 3-metre tall platform in the centre of the studio, with the entire floor padded for safety, and faces three high-speed cannons located on the front and either side of him/her.

In the first part, 15 large green rubber balls are randomly fired towards the player. He must make a contact with as many of them, as each contact results in one point for the team.
In the second part, the gameplay is similar as the cannons fire 15 red balls in an identical fashion, but the player must avoid each of them at all cost, as making contact with a ball results in a point taken away. Also, if the player falls from the platform, a point is deducted.

If after the end of the second part the team has any points left, they win £10,000.

Then they are presented with a gamble - they can risk the £10,000 and play one final part for £20,000. If they accept the gamble, the same player returns to the platform and at any given moment one of the cannons fires up a single golden ball. Should the player touch it, the team wins the grand prize; failure to do so means the team leaves empty-handed. As is shown in a pre-game animation and said by the announcer, in order to win the player must take a "leap of faith", meaning to jump much further from the podium than usual, effectively falling on the floor, as the cannons now shoot much further from the player than before. Obviously, the rule that forbids falling from the platform is not in use in this part of the round.

Production
The series and host were announced in January 2013. The format had originally been piloted by Channel 4 in April 2011, who also opted not to order The Cube following a 2008 pilot. Both shows are created by Adam Adler from company Objective Productions. A non-broadcast pilot was filmed with Jake Humphrey as host in July 2012 at MediaCityUK in Salford. After being commissioned by the BBC, Reflex was filmed at Wembley's Fountain Studios during April 2013.

Technology
Reflex relies heavily on the use of high-speed cameras to capture the action unfolding at great speed. Using a NAC/Ikegami Hi-Motion II Camera, the contestants are filmed competing in tasks at up to 1000 frames per second (fps), which, when played back at conventional television speeds of 25 fps, allows the action to last for up to 40 times longer. At these speeds, human reactions lasting of the order 0.1 seconds are drawn out to 4 seconds in length, allowing for detailed analysis of the challenges.

References

External links

2014 British television series debuts
2014 British television series endings
2010s British game shows
BBC television game shows
English-language television shows
Television series by All3Media